Thorarensen is an Icelandic surname. Notable people with the surname include:

 Bjarni Thorarensen (1786–1841), Icelandic poet and official
 Björg Thorarensen (born 1966), Icelandic professor of law at the University of Iceland
 Jakob Thorarensen (1886–1972), Icelandic writer and poet